Artificial Paradise is the tenth studio album by the Canadian rock band The Guess Who. It was released by RCA Records in 1973. This was the first album by the group to feature bassist Bill Wallace.

Musically, Artificial Paradise finds The Guess Who showcasing a variety of styles: rockers ("Orly", "All Hashed Out," "Rock and Roller Steam"), ballads ("Samantha's Living Room," "Lost and Found Town"), and even world music ("Hamba Gahle-Usalang Gahle").

The album is likely best remembered for its record jacket and inner sleeve, which is an extensive lampoon of direct mail advertising. The cover mentions The Guess Who only in passing.

Release history
In addition to the usual 2 channel stereo version the album was also released by RCA in a 4 channel quadraphonic version on 8-track tape.

Reception
AllMusic's Joe Viglione: "Artificial Paradise may be the most consistent album project by the post-Randy Bachman Guess Who, a solid offering of strong melodies, superb production, and focused artistic vision. (Despite the memorable cover art—or, perhaps, because of it) ...did much to sink this fine effort."

The album peaked at number 102 on the Billboard 200 in March 1973.

Track listing
Side one
"Bye Bye Babe" (Winter, Wallace) - 2:50
"Samantha's Living Room" (McDougall) - 3:26
"Rock and Roller Steam" (Winter, Wallace) - 3:19
"Follow Your Daughter Home" (The Guess Who) - 3:42
"Those Show Biz Shoes" (Cummings) - 6:49 
Side two
"All Hashed Out" (Cummings, Winter, Wallace) - 4:41
"Orly" (Cummings) - 2:35
"Lost and Found Town" (McDougall) - 3:49
"Hamba Gahle-Usalang Gahle" (Cummings, Winter, Wallace) - 4:53
"The Watcher" (Wallace, Cummings) - 3:10

Personnel
The Guess Who
Burton Cummings - lead vocals, keyboards, flute, harpsichord
Kurt Winter - lead guitar
Donnie McDougall - rhythm and acoustic guitar, backing vocals; lead vocals on "Samantha's Living Room" and "Lost and Found Town"
Bill Wallace - bass, backing vocals; lead vocals on "Bye Bye Babe" and "All Hashed Out" (duet)
Garry Peterson - drums

Additional personnel
 Bob Zimmitti - percussion, congas on "Follow Your Daughter Home"
 Stanley Winistock - fiddle on "Orly"

Production 
Jack Richardson - producer
Brian Christian - engineer
Dennis Smith - technician
Vic Anesini - mastering
 Ralph Chapman - liner notes
Pacific Eye & Ear - concept
Marty Slick - liner notes
Lorrie Sullivan - photography
Ron Thompson - writer

Charts
Album

Singles

References

1973 albums
The Guess Who albums
Albums produced by Jack Richardson (record producer)
RCA Victor albums